"State of Independence" is a song written by Jon Anderson and Vangelis.

Originally recorded by Jon and Vangelis for their 1981 album The Friends of Mr Cairo, "State of Independence" was released as a single the same year but did not chart. The song subsequently became better known when Donna Summer released a cover version a year later in 1982, which became a top 20 UK hit single (and repeated the same feat 14 years later when issued as a remixed version in 1996) and becoming a number one hit in the Netherlands. In 1992, a third version of the song — retitled "Spiritual High (State of Independence)" — was recorded and released as a single by Moodswings, with vocals by the Pretenders lead singer Chrissie Hynde.

Original Jon and Vangelis version (and subsequent Anderson re-recordings)
Jon & Vangelis released "State of Independence" as a single in 1981, with "Beside" as the B-Side. It was re-released in 1984 and this version peaked at No. 67 on the UK Singles Chart.

Jon Anderson recorded a new version of the song for his solo album Change We Must (1994) and a live acoustic version can be found on his Live from La La Land (2007). More recently, Anderson also performed the song live with the AndersonPonty Band.

Personnel 
 Vangelis – keyboards, synthesizers
 Jon Anderson – vocals
 Dick Morrissey – saxophone

Donna Summer version

Original cover version (and reissue) 
Donna Summer covered "State of Independence" on her 1982 album Donna Summer produced by Quincy Jones. It was released as the follow-up to her hit single "Love Is in Control (Finger on the Trigger)" in 1982.  This version just missed the U.S. top 40, peaking at No. 41. It did much better in Europe, including a one-week stay at number one on the Dutch Top 40, making it Summer's second chart-topper in the Netherlands. The single was reissued in Europe in 1990 following the release of the compilation album The Best of Donna Summer.

Summer's version is notable for its all-star choir which included Lionel Richie, Dionne Warwick, Diana Ross, Michael Jackson, Brenda Russell, Christopher Cross, Dyan Cannon, James Ingram, Kenny Loggins, Peggy Lipton, Patti Austin, Michael McDonald, and Stevie Wonder.

Summer's version is one of Brian Eno's favourite songs.

1996 remixes 
Following the dance chart success of the 1995 remix of Donna Summer's "I Feel Love", PolyGram issued a remixed version of Summer's recording of "State of Independence". The single, released both on 12" vinyl and CD on PolyGram's sub-label Manifesto, included mixes by Phil Ramocon, Sold Out, DJ Dero, Ralph Falcon & Oscar G, and Jules & Skins. It peaked at No. 13 on the UK Singles Chart in 1996, going one place higher than the original release, with the dance mixes peaking at No. 1 on the UK Dance Singles Chart. The Martin Luther King Jr. sample introduced by Eddie Gordon into the track was to emphasize the full independent meaning of the song as he understood it.

Charts

Weekly charts

Year-end charts

Moodswings version 
In 1992, the duo Moodswings released their album Moodfood, which scored a hit single with their cover version of the song, retitled as "Spiritual High (State of Independence) Pt. II" with vocals by Chrissie Hynde and samples from Martin Luther King Jr.'s 1963 "I Have a Dream" speech. The single peaked at No. 47 on the UK Singles Chart. Their version was later played during the closing credits on the soundtrack of Single White Female and it was also included on the Pretenders' Greatest Hits in 2000.

References

External links
 

1981 singles
1982 singles
1984 singles
1990 singles
1996 singles
Vangelis songs
Jon Anderson songs
Donna Summer songs
Dutch Top 40 number-one singles
Songs written by Jon Anderson
All-star recordings
Polydor Records singles
Geffen Records singles
Warner Records singles
1981 songs
Songs with music by Vangelis